Club Deportivo Español del Alquián is a Spanish football team based in El Alquián, in the autonomous community of Andalusia. Founded in 1955, it plays in Segunda Andaluza Almería, holding home matches at Complejo Deportivo Municipal Los Pinos, with a capacity of 3,000 people.

Season to season

3 seasons in Tercera División

External links
La Preferente profile 
Fútbol Regional profile 

Football clubs in Andalusia
Sport in Almería
Association football clubs established in 1955
1955 establishments in Spain